The following is a list of all IFT-licensed over-the-air television stations broadcasting in the Mexican state of Yucatán. There are 13 television stations in Yucatán.

List of television stations

|-

|-

|-

|-

|-

|-

|-

|-

|-

|-

|-

|-

References

Television stations in Yucatán
Yucatan